Vanesa Arenas (born 17 November 1978) is a Spanish judoka. She competed in the women's extra-lightweight event at the 2000 Summer Olympics.

References

External links
 
 

1978 births
Living people
Spanish female judoka
Olympic judoka of Spain
Judoka at the 2000 Summer Olympics
Sportspeople from Madrid
Mediterranean Games bronze medalists for Spain
Mediterranean Games medalists in judo
Competitors at the 2005 Mediterranean Games
20th-century Spanish women
21st-century Spanish women